Arizona Beverages USA (stylized as AriZona) is a producer of many flavors of iced tea, juice cocktails, and energy drinks based in Woodbury, New York. Arizona's first product was made available in 1992, to compete with Snapple. Both companies originated in New York.

Arizona is known for its "Big Can" drinks holding 23 fl. oz. (680 ml) of iced teas, juice drinks and other beverages that retail for around the price of US$0.99 in the United States and C$1.29 in Canada. Their beverages also come in 16 oz, 11.5 oz, as well as a 128 oz (gallon) of AriZona.

The "Arnold Palmer blend" of iced tea and lemonade has been commercially available since the 1990s, though Arizona has since risen to become the most popular primary distributor of the beverage, with over $100 million in sales in 2010.

Arizona also distributes packed trays of tortilla chip products, consisting of "Nachos 'n' Cheese" and "Salsa 'n' Chips". In 2020, the company introduced a line of fruit snacks in mixed fruit, Arnold Palmer, and green tea varieties.

History
The company roots trace back to 1971 when friends John Ferolito and Don Vultaggio opened a beverage distribution business in Brooklyn, New York. The company was a successful beer distributor.

In 1990, they saw the success of Snapple (also a Brooklyn-based company founded in the 1970s) bottled juices and teas, and attempted to make their product.

In 1992, they produced the first bottles of their own AriZona teas. Vultaggio said the name was originally Santa Fe, in response to the adobe-style house he lived in, but he felt it didn't look right on the packaging. He went with Arizona even though he had never been to the state and, in fact, hadn't even traveled west of the Mississippi River.

The price has remained at $0.99 even with rising costs for the company.

References

External links
 Arizona Beverage Company official website

Companies based in Nassau County, New York
Drink companies of the United States
Energy drinks
Iced tea brands
Soft drinks manufacturers